Anisopappus is a genus of flowering plants in the family Asteraceae.

The genus is primarily native to Africa and Madagascar, with one species (A. chinensis) extending into China and Southeast Asia.

 Species

References

 Mabberley, D.J.(1997):The Plant-Book, 2nd Ed., Cambridge University Press, UK 

 
Asteraceae genera
Taxonomy articles created by Polbot